Events from the year 1936 in China.

Incumbents
President: Lin Sen
Premier: Chiang Kai-shek
Vice Premier: Kung Hsiang-hsi
Foreign Minister: Zhang Qun

Events
October–November - Suiyuan Campaign
December 12 - Xi'an Incident

Births

 Zhang Tingyan
 Zeng Xianyi
 Li Aizhen
 Zhang Xianliang
 Zheng Shuang (artist)
 Xia Feiyun
 Shu Shengyou
 Yuan Xingpei

Deaths
February - Liu Zhidan
August 2 - Zhao Yiman
October 19 - Lu Xun
December 12 - Jiang Xiaoxian, nephew of Chiang Kai-shek

See also
 List of Chinese films of the 1930s

References

 
1930s in China
Years of the 20th century in China